Marmais Point (‘Nos Marmais’ \'nos mar-'ma-is\) is the ice-covered point on the southeast coast of Trinity Peninsula in Graham Land, Antarctica projecting into Prince Gustav Channel in Weddell Sea. The point is named after the Bulgarian duke and military commander Marmais (9th-10th century).

Location
German-British mapping in 1996.

Maps
 Trinity Peninsula. Scale 1:250000 topographic map No. 5697. Institut für Angewandte Geodäsie and British Antarctic Survey, 1996.
 Antarctic Digital Database (ADD). Scale 1:250000 topographic map of Antarctica. Scientific Committee on Antarctic Research (SCAR), 1993–2016.

References
 Bulgarian Antarctic Gazetteer. Antarctic Place-names Commission. (details in Bulgarian, basic data in English)
Marmais Point. SCAR Composite Antarctic Gazetteer.

External links
 Marmais Point. Copernix satellite image

Headlands of Trinity Peninsula
Bulgaria and the Antarctic